Attila Végh (born 1985) is a Hungarian-Slovak mixed martial arts fighter. 

Attila Végh may also refer to:

 Attila Végh (canoeist), Hungarian sprint canoer
 Attila Végh (poet) (born 1962), Hungarian poet